The Robison family murders, also referred to as the Good Hart murders, were the mass murders of Richard Robison, his wife Shirley Robison (née Fulton), and their four children; Ritchie, Gary, Randy, and Susan on June 25, 1968. The upper-middle-class family from the metropolitan Detroit area of Lathrup Village, Michigan, were shot and killed while vacationing in their Lake Michigan cottage just north of Good Hart, Michigan, near the Straits of Mackinac. This case remained unsolved after a 15-month investigation by the Michigan State Police and the Emmet County Sheriff's Office. However, when the investigation was completed in December 1969, evidence pointed to one person: Joseph Raymond Scolaro III, an embezzling employee of Richard Robison.

Crime scene
The murders began with five gunshots aimed at Richard Robison, fired through a rear window from a .22-caliber semi-automatic rifle. The murderer then entered the cottage through an unlocked door and killed the remaining five people with shots to the head from a .25-caliber semi-automatic pistol. Susan and Richard Robison were also bludgeoned with a hammer found at the murder scene.

Shirley Robison's body was intentionally posed so that when the crime scene was discovered it would lead the police to think that the crime was part of a sexual attack. Bloody footprints on the floor  led investigators to conclude that one person committed the murders. The bodies were not discovered for 27 days and conditions at the murder scene resulted in advanced decomposition of the bodies.

Investigation
By the second week of the investigation, which had begun on Monday, July 22, 1968, the Michigan State Police and the Emmet County authorities suspected Richard Robison's employee Joseph R. Scolaro III, aged 30. He had not been seen or heard from for more than twelve hours on the day of the murders, and his alibis for that time period all proved invalid. He had also purchased both of the murder weapons determined by police forensic tests to have been used in the Robison family murders, specifically, a .25 caliber Jet-Fire automatic Beretta pistol #47836, and a .22 caliber AR-7 ArmaLite semi-automatic rifle #75878. The four .22 caliber spent shells found at the cabin murder scene were forensically compared by their ballistic markings to several .22 caliber evidence shells known to have been fired by Scolaro at a family firing range in 1967 at which time Scolaro used his missing .22 caliber ArmaLite rifle #75878. The two sets of shells were found to be an exact match.  Although Scolaro claimed to have given this weapon away, a neighbor had told police he had seen the .22 caliber AR-7 rifle in Scolaro's house not long before the Robisons were killed.

Scolaro's missing .25 caliber Beretta automatic pistol #47836, which he also claimed to police to have given away prior to the June 25, 1968 murders, was matched forensically in
similar class characteristics to a second identical .25 caliber Beretta pistol #47910 that he produced for police on the second day after the bodies were found in Good Hart. Both guns had been purchased by Scolaro on the same day, February 2, 1968. Also found at the murder scene were several Sako .25 caliber spent cartridges, a rare 1968 Finnish brand sold only for the limited time of a few weeks in Michigan (January–February, 1968) prior to the murders. It was documented by investigators that one of the actual few Sako ammunition purchasers in Michigan had been Joseph Scolaro III, on February 2, 1968. Scolaro's statements that he had given away both of the missing murder weapons and the Sako ammunition prior to the June 25, 1968 killings also proved invalid. They were one more part of his elaborate scheme to obstruct the investigation of the crime. During the lengthy murder investigation it was determined by a forensic accountant that more than $60,000 was missing from the two combined businesses of Richard Robison. The two Robison businesses had been left in the care of the suspect Scolaro prior to the murders. The two investigating police agencies involved in the case presented their combined Evidence Case Report CR 4114-08-785-66 to the jurisdictional prosecution on December 17, 1969. The detailed report implicated Joseph Scolaro as the sole perpetrator of the mass murder crime. In mid-January 1970, Emmet County prosecutor Donald C. Noggle decided not to bring charges against Scolaro at that time, citing the two missing murder weapons and the absence of his fingerprints from the crime scene.

Outcome
During the course of the investigation, the suspect Scolaro failed two lie detector tests; a third test  was judged inconclusive as to the truth. It was also noted that he tried to deceive the polygraph interviewers in his pre-test interviews. Four years later, a newly elected chief prosecutor in Oakland County, L. Brooks Patterson, believed the Robison crime had originated within his jurisdiction and reopened the prosecution. When the prime suspect Scolaro learned of the impending charges and arrest, he committed suicide on March 8, 1973. Scolaro left behind a typewritten note on which he wrote "I am a lier [sic]—a cheat—a phony" with a list of people he had swindled in multiple business schemes. He then added a handwritten note to his mother on the same sheet of paper saying "I had nothing to do with the Robisons—I'm a liar but not a murderer—I'm sick and scared—God and everyone please forgive me." Since Michigan law does not permit an open murder case to be officially closed, the suicide of the prime suspect Scolaro placed the case in the inactive file. Thus, many questions remained unanswered. Over many years other crime theories have surfaced but to date none has ever been substantiated.

Those who personally knew Mr. Robison were quoted in the two police reports filed on the case as saying they had never known a better family man, friend, or business partner.

See also 

 List of homicides in Michigan
 List of unsolved deaths
 Freeman family murders
 Lin family murders (Australia)
 Richardson family murders
 Sakamoto family murders

References

External links

Family murders
Mass murder in 1968
1968 murders in the United States
Murder in Michigan
1968 in Michigan
June 1968 events in the United States
Emmet County, Michigan
Deaths by firearm in Michigan
1968 mass shootings in the United States
Mass shootings in the United States
Unsolved mass murders in the United States